The 2019 California Golden Bears football team represented the University of California, Berkeley in the 2019 NCAA Division I FBS football season. They competed as members of the North Division of the Pac-12 Conference. In their third year under head coach Justin Wilcox, the Bears improved to an 8–5 record for only the second time since 2009, finishing 2nd in the Pac-12 North.

The Bears started off the season strong, achieving a No. 15 AP ranking (their highest since 2009) after a 4–0 start, including a 20–19 upset win against No. 14 ranked Washington. However, after injury to quarterback Chase Garbers during the Arizona State game, the Bears proceeded to lose the next four games.

With the return of Garbers, Cal notably defeated Stanford in the Big Game for the first time since 2009. This win clinched bowl eligibility for the Bears while making the Cardinal ineligible for the post-season for the first time in ten years. The Bears went to the Redbox Bowl, where they defeated the Illinois Fighting Illini 35–20, their first bowl win since 2015.

Senior linebacker Evan Weaver was the standout player of the season after leading the nation with a school-record and Pac-12 record 182 tackles, earning him the Pac-12 Defensive Player of the Year and becoming the first consensus All-American from Cal since 2006.

Previous season

In 2018, the Bears went 7–6 under second-year head coach Justin Wilcox. After the Bears upset #15 Washington 12–10 and defeated USC 15–14 at the Coliseum in Los Angeles to snap a 14-year losing streak to the Trojans, the Bears lost 10–7 in overtime to TCU in the 2018 Cheez-It Bowl. The Bears’ offensive efficiency ranked as the second worst among all Power Five teams.

Preseason

Coaching changes
On February 26, 2019, defensive line coach Tony Tuioti left the Golden Bears to become the new defensive line coach for the Nebraska Cornhuskers under Scott Frost. Andrew Browning was named the Bears' new defensive line coach on February 27, 2019. Browning is the third defensive line coach in three years under Justin Wilcox after Jerry Azzinaro's departure in 2017.

Pac-12 media days

Pac-12 media poll
In the 2019 Pac-12 preseason media poll, California was voted to finish in fifth place in the North Division.

Schedule
Three of California first four games were non-conference games, starting on August 31 against UC Davis of the Big Sky Conference. The Golden Bears then played their conference opener against Washington. Rounding out the non-conference slate was a home game against North Texas of Conference USA and a road game against Ole Miss of the Southeastern Conference (SEC). In Pac-12 Conference play, Cal played the other members of the North Division and faced Arizona State, UCLA, USC, and Utah from the South Division. They did not play Arizona and Colorado.

Source:

Game summaries
* Home games are in dark blue

UC Davis

at Washington

The game started at 7:30 pm, but was paused at the end of first quarter due to a lightning storm; the pause lasted for approximately two and a half hours. By the time of the restart - 10 pm, there was only approximately 16,000 of the original approximately 60,000 fans left at the venue.  Relying on rushing of running backs Christopher Brown Jr. (80 yards), and Marcel Dancy (72 yards, 2 touchdowns) and quarterback Chase Garbers (42 yards), Cal won on a last minute field goal by Greg Thomas. This was the Golden Bears second straight win against the Huskies. In the 2018 home game Cal upset No. 15 Washington 12 to 10.

North Texas

at Ole Miss

Arizona State

In the final drive of the first half, quarterback Chase Garbers was injured, breaking his right collarbone. Gabrers would not be cleared to play again until he started against USC.

at Oregon

Oregon State

at Utah

This defeat was the first shutout of a California team since a 1999 defeat to No. 5 Nebraska. Starting quarterback Chase Garbers and backup Devon Modster were injured for the game.

Washington State

USC

at Stanford

With this victory, Cal ended Stanford's nine-year win streak in the Big Game. The win also ensured the Bears' qualification to a bowl game for the second consecutive year, the first time this has happened in ten years. Likewise, the loss put Stanford at 4–7 for the season, ending its hopes of making its tenth consecutive bowl game.

at UCLA

vs. Illinois (Redbox Bowl)

Personnel

Coaching staff

Roster

Rankings

Media affiliates

Radio
KGO 810 AM - Joe Starkey, Mike Pawlawski, Todd McKim, Hal Ramey
KALX 90.7 FM

TV
Pac-12 Network
FSN/ESPN

Players drafted into the NFL

References

California
California Golden Bears football seasons
Redbox Bowl champion seasons
California Golden Bears football